Varsha R Ashwathi is an Indian actress, who appears in Tamil films. Varsha won the 'Miss Beautiful' title in the 2006 "Miss" Chennai contest. In the year 2009, Varsha made her acting debut in Tamil film Peranmai which co-starred Jeyam Ravi.

Early career 
After appearing in the Miss Chennai pageant, Varsha's film career began with award-winning director S. P. Jananathan's film Peranmai, in which she played the character of Tulsi an NCC girl, though she had no acting experience. In 2012, Varsha played an IPS Officer 'Agnes' in Neerparavai, where she acted with Nandita Das. Varsha later performed in Nagaraja Cholan MA, MLA. She is currently busy shooting for Tamil films Pani Vizhum Malarvanam, Endrendrum Punnagai and Kangaroo. Varsha is all set to debut in the Malayalam film industry with Don’t Worry Be Happy. In the film directed by Shaison Ouseph, she plays a TV anchor of a reality show involving seven married couples.

Filmography 
All films are in Tamil, unless otherwise noted.

References 

1989 births
Actresses from Kolkata
Living people
Actresses in Tamil cinema
21st-century Indian actresses
Indian film actresses